Cerodrillia clappi is a species of sea snail, a marine gastropod mollusk in the family Drilliidae.

It is the type species of the genus Cerodrillia.

Description
The shell grows to a length of 12 mm.

Distribution
This species occurs in the Gulf of Mexico from the Florida Keys to Texas at depths between 7 m and 73 m.

References

 Bartsch, Paul, and Harald A. Rehder. "New turritid mollusks from Florida." Proceedings of the United States National Museum (1939).
 Rosenberg, G., F. Moretzsohn, and E. F. García. 2009. Gastropoda (Mollusca) of the Gulf of Mexico, pp. 579–699 in Felder, D.L. and D.K. Camp (eds.), Gulf of Mexico–Origins, Waters, and Biota. Biodiversity. Texas A&M Press, College Station, Texas
 Fallon P.J. (2016). Taxonomic review of tropical western Atlantic shallow water Drilliidae (Mollusca: Gastropoda: Conoidea) including descriptions of 100 new species. Zootaxa. 4090(1): 1–363

External links
 

clappi
Gastropods described in 1939